Amitoze Singh (born 14 February 1989) is an Indian cricketer who plays first-class cricket for Punjab. Amitoze is a right-hand batsman and right-arm medium pace bowler. He was one of the domestic signings of Mumbai Indians in 2012. In June 2021, he was selected to take part in the Minor League Cricket tournament in the United States following the players' draft.

References

External links

Living people
1989 births
Indian cricketers
Punjab, India cricketers
Mumbai Indians cricketers